Dunajewski (feminine: Dunajewska) is a Polish surname. The Russian equalent is Dunayevsky. Notable people with the surname include:

 Albin Dunajewski (1817–1894), Polish bishop
 Andrzej Dunajewski (1908–1944), Polish zoologist and ornithologist

Polish-language surnames